Ugochi Constance Alam (born 4 May 1988) is a Paralympian athlete from Nigeria competing mainly in category F57/58 shot put and discus throw events.

Alam competed in the 2022 Commonwealth Games and placed third, winning the bronze medal in the women's shot put F57/F58 event.

References 

Living people
1973 births
Nigerian female shot putters
Athletes (track and field) at the 2022 Commonwealth Games
Commonwealth Games bronze medallists for Nigeria
20th-century Nigerian women
21st-century Nigerian women
Medallists at the 2022 Commonwealth Games